The Hintere Eggenspitze is a mountain in the Ortler Alps on the border between South Tyrol and Trentino, Italy.

References 
 Peter Holl: Alpenvereinsführer Ortleralpen, 9. Auflage, München 2003, 
 Eduard Richter (Redaktion): Die Erschließung der Ostalpen, II. Band, Verlag des Deutschen und Oesterreichischen Alpenvereins, Berlin, 1894
 Casa Editrice Tobacco, Udine: Carta topografica 1:25.000, Blatt 045, Laces / Latsch, Val Martello / Martell, Silandro / Schlanders

Mountains of the Alps
Mountains of South Tyrol
Mountains of Trentino
Alpine three-thousanders
Ortler Alps